The Alids are those who claim descent from the family of ʿAlī ibn Abī Ṭālib (600–661 CE), the fourth rāshidūn caliph (r. 656–661) and the first Imam of Islam—cousin, son-in-law, and companion (ṣaḥāba) of Muhammad—through all his wives.

History 

Primarily Sunnī Muslims in the Arab world reserve the term sharīf or sherīf  for the descendants of Ḥasan ibn ʿAlī, while the term sayyid is used for the descendants of Ḥasan's brother, Ḥusayn ibn ʿAlī. Both Ḥasan and Ḥusayn were grandchildren of Muhammad, through the marriage of his cousin ʿAlī ibn Abī Ṭālib and his daughter Fāṭimah. Ever since the post-Hashemite era began, the term sayyid has been used to denote descendants from both Ḥasan and Ḥusayn. Arab Shīʿa Muslims use the terms sayyid and habib to denote descendants from both Ḥasan and Ḥusayn; see .

Every Hashmi who were from Banu Hashim claims the title of Sayyid, Syed, Shareef, but After Fatimid Caliphs arrived they give a Federal Fatwa that Only descendents of Hassan and Hussain are now be called Sayyid. Historical claim that Every Abbasid Caliph use Sayyid title because they were descendents of Abbas ibn Abdul Muttalib (who was the uncle of Muhammad and Grand son of Hahsim), But When Ayyubid cames every Alawi uses title again but after all Ulma and Fuqha were pressurized to call sayyid only for Hassan and Hussain Descendents

Lines 
There are several dynasties of Alid origin in the Muslim world. All of them exist under two main branches, the Ashrāfites and Alawids:
ʿAlī ibn Abī Ṭālib:
Ashrāfites/Sayyids, descendants of Muhammad through the marriage of his cousin ʿAlī and his daughter Fāṭimah:
Ḥasan ibn ʿAlī and Ḥusayn ibn ʿAlī, grandsons of Muhammad
Zayd ibn Ḥasan
Ḥasan ibn Zayd of the Zaydid dynasty of Tabaristan (Alavids)
Ḥasan al-Muthanna ibn Ḥasan
Abdullah al-Kamil ibn Ḥasan al-Muthanna
Musa al-Jawn ibn Abdullah al-Kamil
Abdullah II
ʿAbdul Qādir Gīlānī, founder of the Qadri Sufi Order
Nazim Al-Haqqani, founder of the Naqshbandi Haqqani Sufi Order (Osmanli Dergah)
Ibrahim ibn Musa al-Jawn
Muhammad ibn Yusuf al-Ukhaidhir ibn Ibrahim of the Ukhaydhirite dynasty of al-Yamama
Abdullah al-Salih ibn Musa al-Jawn
Musa al-Thani ibn Abdullah al-Salih
Banu Qatadah/Hashemites
Sharifs of Mecca
Kings of Jordan
Kings of Iraq
Kings of Hejaz
Kings of Syria
Sulayman ibn Abdullah al-Salih of the Sulaymānid Sharifs of Mecca and Jizan
Ja'far ibn Abdullah al-Kamil of the Sharifs of Sousse, Tunisia
Muhammad al-Nafs al-Zakiyya ibn Abdullah al-Kamil of the Alawite dynasty of Morocco
Saadid dynasty of Morocco
Idris al-Akbar ibn Abdullah al-Kamil of the Idrisid dynasty of Morocco
Hammudid dynasty of Algeciras, Málaga, Seville, and the Emirate of Granada
Senussids of Libya
Sulayman ibn Abdullah al-Kamil of the Sulaymānid dynasty of Tlemcen, Archgoul, Ténès (Western Algeria)
Da'wud ibn Hasan al-Muthanna
Sulayman ibn Da'wud of the Sulaymanid dynasty
Ibrahim al-Ghamr ibn Hasan al-Muthanna
Isma'il ibn Ibrahim al-Ghamr
Ibrahim Tabataba ibn Isma'il
Al-Qasim al-Rassi ibn Ibrahim Tabataba of the Rassid dynasty of Yemen
Ḥusayn ibn ʿAlī:
Shīʿīte Imams in Ismāʿīlīsm
Fatimid dynasty (claimed descent)
Shīʿīte Imams in Nizārīsm
Bukhari Sayyids of Bukhara
Baha' al-Din Naqshband, founder of the Naqshbandi Sufi Order
Hazrat Ishaan, leader of the Naqshbandi Sufi Order
Sayyid Mir Jan and Dakik family
The Tolje'lo and Guled dynasties of the Isaaq Sultanate as well as the Ainanshe dynasty of the Habr Yunis Sultanate through Ishaaq bin Ahmed, founder and forefather of the Isaaq clan-family
The Safavid dynasty claims descent from Ḥusayn ibn ʿAlī, sharing the first five original rulers with the Fatimids.  Many scholars have cast doubt on this claim, and there seems to be consensus among scholars that the Safavid family hailed from Persian Kurdistan.
Al-Qasimi (Qawasim) dynasty of the Emirates of Sharjah and Ras al-Khaimah, claims descent from the 10th Shīʿīte Imam, Ali al-Hadi.
Alawids, the descendants of ʿAlī ibn Abī Ṭālib through his other wives after Fāṭimah:
Muhammad ibn al-Hanafiyyah
Awn Qutb Shah Ghazi
Awans of Ghaznavid era (maliks)
Abbas ibn Ali
Qutb Shah
Awans
Avanoğlu families of Turkey
Saltukids

Genealogical trees 

This is a table of the interrelationships between the different parts of the Alid dynasties:

Below is a simplified family tree of Hasan and Husayn ibn Ali. For the ancestors of ibn Ali see the family tree of Muhammad and the family tree of Ali. People in italics are considered by the majority of Sunni and Shia Muslims to be Ahl al-Bayt (People of the House). The Twelver Shia also see the 4th to 12th Imamah as Ahl al-Bayt.

Family tree of Hasan ibn Ali 
The Hashemites of Sharifate of Mecca, Kings of Jordan, Syria and Iraq are descended from Hasan ibn Ali:

The Alaouites, Kings of Morocco, are also descended from Hasan ibn Ali through Al-Hassan Ad-Dakhil:

Genealogoical chart of the descent from Muhammad of the Idrisid dynasty, rulers of Fez and Morocco, Kings of Tunis, and the Senussi dynasty, founders and heads of the Libyan Senussi Order and Kings of Libya are also descended from Hasan ibn Ali through Idris al-Azhar.

Family tree of Husayn ibn Ali 

The kin which ruled over Medina were descended from the other brother Husayn ibn Ali.

See also 
Family tree of Muhammad
Genealogy of Khadijah's daughters
Family tree of Ali
Family tree of Hasan ibn Ali
Family tree of Husayn ibn Ali
Rashidun

References

External links 
Descendants of Ali ibn Abi Talib (Dynastie des Alides, in French):
Moroccan branch of the Alids (among which the members of the (royal) Alaouite dynasty of Morocco): 
Idrisid branch of the Alids (among which the members of the (royal) Idrissid dynasty of Morocco): 
Fatimid branch 

Family of Muhammad
 
Ali
Muslim family trees
Islamic terminology
Islamic honorifics
Arabic words and phrases
Hashemite people
Fatimah
History of the Middle East
Arabs
Turkish Arab people
Descendants of individuals
Muslim communities of India